The Cypress of Kashmar was a cypress tree regarded as sacred to followers of Zoroastrianism. According to the Iranian epic Shahnameh, the tree had grown from a branch Zoroaster had carried away from Paradise and which he planted in honor of King Vishtaspa's conversion to Zoroastrianism in Kashmarbalkh. The spreading branches of the tree are used as an allusion to the spread of Zoroaster's creed. 

On 10 December 861 AD, Abbasid caliph al-Mutawakkil ordered the tree be felled and transported to his capital in Samarra where its wood would be used as beams for his new palace. The villagers who lived near the tree pleaded with the caliph and offered money for its protection, to no avail. The palace and its spiral minaret still stand today.

See also 
 Adur Burzen-Mihr
 Zoroastrian Sarv
 Torshiz
 List of individual trees

References 

860s individual tree deaths
Persian literature
Persian mythology
Trees in religion
Individual conifers
Trees in mythology
Kashmar County
Mythology
Abbasid Caliphate
Mythological archetypes
Zoroastrianism
Destroyed individual trees
History of Kashmar